Timothy Salter (born in Mexborough, Yorkshire in 1942) is an English composer, conductor and pianist.

Biography
Timothy Salter studied at St John's College, Cambridge, where he won the John Stewart of Rannoch Scholarship in sacred music. His piano teachers included York Bowen and Lamar Crowson. He has composed chamber and orchestral music, choral music and songs. He founded Usk Recordings in 1995 and is the musical director of The Ionian Singers.

He is co-author with Edward Lowbury and Alison Young of Thomas Campion, Poet, Composer, Physician, publisher: Chatto & Windus, London 1970, SBN 7011 1477 0.

For many years he taught composition and performance studies at the Royal College of Music, where he designed collaborative composer/performer courses and in conjunction with Edwin Roxburgh conducted the Twentieth Century Ensemble. He was awarded the Fellowship of the Royal College of Music in 2004 for services to music.

References

External links
 Timothy Salter's Website
 Review of "Aerial" recording, November 2013 - MusicWeb International 
 Review of "After the Sun" recording, December 2005 - MusicWeb International 
 Review of "Piano Quartet" recording, April 2009 - MusicWeb International
 Review of "The Country of the Stars" recording, October 2001 - Gramophone
 Review of "Diptych" recording, April 2003 - Gramophone
 Review of "Mondrian Pictures" concert, October 2011 - Independent
 Review of "Three Night Pieces" concert, July 2003 - The Guardian
 Review of "Equipoise" concert, January 2003 - The Guardian
 Review of "Trefoil" concert, April 2014 - Musical Opinion
 Review of "Arias for Percussion" concert, March 2006 - Classical Source
 Review of "Piano Trio" concert, January 2011 - Classical Source
  Review of "Piano Quintet"  "Elegy"  "Clarinet Quintet" recording, May 2012 and April 2015 - MusicWeb International

English classical composers
21st-century classical composers
People from Mexborough
1942 births
Living people
English male classical composers
Alumni of St John's College, Cambridge
21st-century British male musicians